The Battle of James Island was a minor engagement on November 14, 1782, just outside Charleston, South Carolina, between American and British forces. British troops were on the move attempting to evacuate most of the Americans. In an effort to encourage the evacuation of British troops, American forces attempted to ambush British troops cutting wood; however, reinforcements were quickly brought to the British side and the American soldiers were forced to retreat. About 70 American troops had attempted to rout and defeat British troops in the area. The British, after receiving reinforcements, numbered more than 300 soldiers and vastly outnumbered the Americans. Several Americans were killed, including Captain William Wilmont, the last continental soldier killed in the Carolinas.  In addition to Wilmont, an enslaved African American, William Smith, was taken captive by the British forces and died in British captivity. As the skirmish finished, the remaining American troops retreated. The British would soon withdraw from the Americas, marking the end of the American Revolutionary War.

References

James Island
James Island
18th-century in Charleston, South Carolina